Katherine Binney Shippen (April 1, 1892 –  February 20, 1980) was an American history teacher, museum curator, and children's writer.

Early life and education
Shippen was born in Hoboken, New Jersey, on April 1, 1892, to Francis and Ellen Shippen. She earned a B.A. from Bryn Mawr College in 1914 and an M.A. from Columbia University in 1929.

Career
While studying for her master's degree, Shippen taught history at the Beard School (now Morristown-Beard School) in Orange, New Jersey (1917–26) and then at The Brearley School in Manhattan borough (1926–35). She then served as the headmistress at Miss Fine's School (now Princeton Day School) in Princeton, New Jersey, for the next nine years. In 1945, the Brooklyn Children's Museum named Shippen curator of the social studies department. In the same year, she published her first book, New Found World. Shippen published 21 books throughout her career and twice won the Newbery Honor Award. Several of her books have been translated into Swedish, German, Polish, Spanish, and Greek editions. She died on February 20, 1980, in Suffern, NY.

Books

References

External links

 Katherine B. Shippen at Library of Congress Authorities — with 25 catalog records

 

American non-fiction children's writers
20th-century American non-fiction writers
Newbery Honor winners
Bryn Mawr College alumni
Columbia University alumni
Writers from Hoboken, New Jersey
1892 births
1980 deaths
American headmistresses
20th-century American women writers